(), also known as the hairpin ceremony, is the equivalent of the ; the  marks the transition from childhood to adulthood of a Chinese woman and involves the use of a . It is only after the  ceremony that a woman is considered an adult and is therefore eligible to be married. In ancient times, the  ceremony could be performed by people of any social class; however, rich people were more likely to hold the ceremony than poor people.

Origins 

Age 

The  ceremony occurs when a girl is engaged or if she is getting married. However, it typically takes place when a young girl reaches the age of 15 even if the girl is not engaged or married. If the young girl was still not betrothed at the age of 20, the  ceremony had to be performed again.

Procedures of  ceremony 
The procedure of the  ceremony occurs through the following steps:

 A married woman, typically one of the girl's relatives, combs the hair of the young woman,
 The hair of the young woman is gathered up into a bun before being fastened with a ji (hairpin) which is typically inscribed with auspicious patterns.
 She is then given an adult name.
 The hairpin is later removed after the ceremony.

After the  ceremony, women had to learn how to be proper wives; this learning including the proper manner of speech and dress. They also had to learn needlework.

Derivatives and influences

Korea 
Korean women perform a coming-of-age ceremony that follows the Confucian tradition known as Gyerye where they would braid their hair and roll it up into a chignon before putting it in place with a binyeo (i.e., a hairpin) on their 15th birthday.

Vietnam 
The tuổi cập kê (also known as the age of wearing hairpin) occurs when a girl reaches the age of 15. At the age of 15, the girl starts to wear a hairpin, and the hairpin becomes an inseparable aspect of a woman; as such, giving a hairpin to a man symbolizes that the woman trusts the man completely. It is based on a Chinese custom.

Related content 
 Guan Li – equivalent ceremony for male
 Chinese hairpin
 Hanfu

See also 
 Genpuku, the Japanese coming-of-age ceremony
 Cug Huê Hng, the Teochew coming-of-age ceremony

References 

Chinese culture
Rites of passage
East Asian traditions
Confucian rites